Sophomores is an American college comedy series created and written by Yonas Michael, which premiered on GSTV, People TV, and online on March 17, 2010. The student-produced series, co-executive produced by Yonas Michael and Sharon Ezra, parodies college life and youth culture, blending elements of a thirty-minute sitcom with a teen-oriented character drama. The show was produced by Georgia State Television and filmed on the campus of Georgia State University in Atlanta, Georgia. The first season was aired in the Spring of 2010. In January 2011 the second season went into production in high definition. 

The show revolves around the sardonic lives of five college sophomores and the very different yet equally dysfunctional situations they fall into, through the lens of a transfer student with a troubled past. By approaching various stereotypes of young people, the series explores their worlds within the context of campus life and the so-called "best four years" of their lives.

The first season of Sophomores is available for online streaming at the official website.

Sophomores is the story of a transfer student, Margeaux Peters (Michelle Rafferty), who comes to Bardell University, a fictional college in an ambiguous location in the United States, only to be entangled with five vastly different students who are interconnected via a shared class: Clive Jenkins (Nikko Pearson), a former high school jock and current campus joke, Lizabeth Martin (Maiya Milan Gitryte), a designer-wearing social climber who can't seem to get along with anyone, Luke Jameson (Joseph Shepherd), a passive third-time sophomore with dreams of being a rock star, and the infamous Kyla Cane (Julianna Strack), the roommate from hell who'd rather study a homicide than a textbook. Between sorority rivalries, disastrous group projects, and a shocking secret from freshman year, Margeaux quickly realizes that she hasn't quite seen it all and may not want to. The series plays on these stereotypes of college students to form a refreshingly new perspective on an old concept.

Sophomores is now available on DVD and is returning for a second season in high definition in January 2011, according to Amazon.com.

References

2010s American college television series
2010s American sitcoms